Pete McKee (born 1 February 1966) is a painter and commercial artist from Sheffield, England. He is a cartoonist for the Sheffield Telegraphs sports section. He has exhibited regularly around the North of England. Using bright colours his characters inhabit a world of working men's clubs, bingo halls and family trips to the seaside. Football is also heavily featured in his work although he regularly depicts fans from both halves of the footballing divide in Sheffield: Sheffield United and Sheffield Wednesday, the team he himself supports.

Biography 
Peter Robert McKee was born on 1 February 1966 in Sheffield to steelworker Frank McKee and Marjorie McKee (née Bullas) and grew up on a council estate in the Batemoor area of the city with two older brothers and one elder sister. His mother died of cancer when he was eight years old.

Educated at Rowlinson Comprehensive School McKee's ambition was to go to art college however he ended up working in a factory. McKee instead was able to find a creative outlet through music (his current band is a ukulele group under the name of 'The Everly Pregnant Brothers') as well as designing logos and similar pieces of art although at the time his main focus was to try to find a record producer.

McKee started sending drawings to a Sheffield Wednesday fanzine for which they offered him £50. Encouraged by this McKee started drawing for the Sheffield Telegraph and continues to do so. McKee decided to concentrate on his painting in 2004 and began by painting with emulsion on MDF boards.

McKee opened his first London show, entitled ‘Lost Weekends’ in 2007 and has also exhibited in Birmingham and New York City since then.  Subsequently, he was commissioned by Acme Studios to interpret characters from US TV shows The Simpsons, Family Guy and Futurama.

In 2007 McKee was commissioned by Oasis guitarist Noel Gallagher to paint him as part of Gibson Guitar’s “Guitar Town” show.  McKee painted a portrait of the guitarist onto a 10-foot fibreglass guitar which was displayed as part of the open air exhibition on London’s South Bank. In 2009 he created artwork for the Arctic Monkeys boxed set At the Apollo.

In early 2010 McKee was invited to design a limited edition pair of Clarks Desert Boots, using the original style template. To celebrate the heritage of the original boot he created images featuring a group of Mods, for the men’s boot, and Modettes for the women's. The boots were sold in selected Clarks stores, specifically in Paris, New York and Japan.

Later in 2010 McKee collaborated with fashion designer Sir Paul Smith, staging an exhibition of his work at Smith's Tokyo store. This saw the development of Teenage Kicks – a limited edition book celebrating the influence of music on youth fashion. Selected images were reproduced on Paul Smith clothing and bags specifically for the Japanese market.

In June 2010 McKee opened a dedicated art gallery "A Month of Sundays" on Sharrow Vale Road in Hunters Bar, Sheffield. After a number of years the shop was renamed Pete Mckee.

2012 saw McKee being invited to take part in a special project from Warp Films, celebrating its tenth birthday. Pete was asked to re-create ten posters from ten of their iconic films, including Dead Man's Shoes, Submarine and This is England.

More recently, he has also painted several murals around Sheffield.

In 2018 his collaborative show, ‘THIS CLASS WORKS’, sold out, with over 10,000 visitors coming to see this exhibition. 2018 also saw Pete received an honorary doctorate from Sheffield Hallam University.

Exhibitions

Urban Legends (November 2004)
A Month of Sundays (January 2005)
The Boy with a Leg Named Brian (October 2005)
Northern Soul (November 2005)
Jumpers for Goalposts (July 2006)
Wish you were here (June 2006)
Loneliness of a Fat Distance Runner (October 2006)
Lost Weekends (November 2006)
A Month of Sundays (June 2007)
33 (April 2008)
22 Views of Sheffield (November 2008)
Snooker City - Sheffield (April 2009)
Great Moments in Music History - Manchester (October 2009)
Teenage Kicks - Tokyo (April 2010)
A Month of Sundays - Scarborough  (March 2011)
The McKee Collection - The Biscuit Factory Newcastle (March - June 2011)
Great Moments in Popular Music - SNAP Galleries London (September 2011)
The Joy of Sheff - Blue Shed Sheffield (May 2013)
Thud, Crackle, Pop - London (May 2014)
6 Weeks to Eternity - Magna Rotherham (May 2016)
Marjorie - Herd of Sheffield (July - October 2016)
This Class Works - 92 Burton Rd Sheffield (July 2018)

References

20th-century English painters
English male painters
21st-century English painters
Artists from Sheffield
Living people
1966 births
20th-century English male artists
21st-century English male artists